Bhimgarh Fort, generally known as the Reasi Fort, is near Reasi, a town approximately 64 km northwest of Jammu. The fort is on a hillock approximately 150 metres high. Initially, it was constructed of clay by Rajput king Bhimdev Rasyal Of Reasi . Later on one of the heirs of Raja Rishipal Rana, reconstructed it using stone. It was used by the royal family members for taking shelter during emergencies. The construction of a new fort at the site was started by Rajput Raja Gulab Singh of Jammu in 1817 and continued till 1841. The construction and consolidation of Bhimgarh fort was further advanced by the advent of General Zorawar Singh. The renovation of the fort was started by Gulab Singh of Jammu and Kashmir in 1817 and continued till 1841. A new entry gate and a stone wall one m wide and 50 m long was built all around, thereby making it less vulnerable to attacks.

The main entry gate is made of Baluka stones with Architecture of carving. The front wall has loopholes. This has a statue of the Goddess Mahakali and of God Hanuman.     

The fort has a temple, a pond, rooms of different sizes, armoury and treasury. After the death of Maharaja Gulab Singh, his heir Maharaja Ranbir Singh and Maharaja Pratap Singh used Bhimgarh Fort as a treasury and armoury. During Maharaja Hari Singh's rule an English minister ordered that the armoury be destroyed and shifted the treasury to Jammu.

Bhimgar Fort was handed over to the Jammu and Kashmir State Archaeology Department in 1989 on the orders of the state government. In 1990, the fort was renovated by the Vaishno Devi Sthapna Board. The surrounding areas were given a facelift with the construction of gardens and pathways. The fort was then opened to the public. Though, the fort is devastated by the earthquakes and lack of maintenance, it stands out as an important landmark in the town.

References

Forts in Jammu and Kashmir
Rajput architecture